Semtek v. Lockheed Martin, 531 U.S. 497 (2001), is a United States Supreme Court case in which the Court held that the claim preclusive effect of a federal judgment on a claim over which subject matter jurisdiction is based solely on diversity is determined by the common law of the state in which the federal district court rendering the decision is located.

Background 
Petitioners Semtek International Incorporated filed a complaint against Lockheed Martin in California state court, alleging a breach of contract. The case was removed to the local federal district court due to the diversity of citizenship in the case. The trial judge then dismissed the complaint, writing that California's 2-year statute of limitations made the claim "barred".

Semtek International had also filed a claim in Maryland's state court. The court here also dismissed the complaint, but on the grounds that "the res judicata effect" precludes this separate claim in a different state. Since another federal court had dismissed a similar action already, Semtek could not proceed in a different court on virtually similar contentions.

Opinion of the Court 
Justice Antonin Scalia wrote the unanimous decision of the Supreme Court, reversing the decision of the Maryland courts. Scalia wrote that there was no final "judgment on the merits" in the California case and thus the Maryland trial was not precluded. A reading of the appropriate rule could be seen as still permitting other actions. Therefore, Semtek was entitled to a trial before the Maryland courts and the case was remanded with such instructions.

See also 
 Erie Doctrine
 Jurisdiction
 U.S. Supreme Court

References

External links 
 

United States Supreme Court cases
2001 in United States case law
Lockheed Martin
Diversity jurisdiction case law
United States res judicata case law
United States Supreme Court cases of the Rehnquist Court
Conflict of laws case law
United States Erie Doctrine